Route 610 or Highway 610 may refer to:

Canada
  Alberta Highway 610
 Manitoba Provincial Road 610
  New Brunswick Route 610
  Ontario Highway 610
 Saskatchewan Highway 610

Costa Rica
  National Route 610

United States
  Interstate 610
  Maryland Route 610
  Minnesota State Highway 610
  Nevada State Route 610
  North Carolina Highway 610
  Puerto Rico Highway 610